The word electricity refers generally to the movement of electrons (or other charge carriers) through a conductor in the presence of a potential difference or an electric field.  The speed of this flow has multiple meanings.  In everyday electrical and electronic devices, the signals travel as electromagnetic waves typically at 50%–99% of the speed of light in vacuum, while the electrons themselves move much more slowly; see drift velocity and electron mobility.

Electromagnetic waves

The speed at which energy or signals travel down a cable is actually the speed of the electromagnetic wave traveling along (guided by) the cable. I.e., a cable is a form of a waveguide. The propagation of the wave is affected by the interaction with the material(s) in and surrounding the cable, caused by the presence of electric charge carriers (interacting with the electric field component) and magnetic dipoles (interacting with the magnetic field component). These interactions are typically described using mean field theory by the permeability and the permittivity of the materials involved.
The energy/signal usually flows overwhelmingly outside the electric conductor of a cable; the purpose of the conductor is thus not to conduct energy, but to guide the energy-carrying wave.

Velocity of electromagnetic waves in good dielectrics
The velocity of electromagnetic waves in a low-loss dielectric is given by

where
   = speed of light in vacuum.
  = the permeability of free space = 4π x 10−7 H/m.
  = relative magnetic permeability of the material.  Usually in good dielectrics, eg. vacuum, air, Teflon, .
 .
  = the permitivity of free space =  8.854 x 10−12 F/m.
  = relative permitivity of the material.  Usually in good conductors eg. copper, silver, gold, .
 .

Velocity of electromagnetic waves in good conductors
The velocity of transverse electromagnetic (TEM) mode waves in a good conductor is given by  

where 
  = frequency.
  = angular frequency = 2f.
  = conductivity of annealed copper = .
  = conductivity of the material relative to the conductivity of copper.  For hard drawn copper  may be as low as 0.97.
 .

and permeability is defined as above in 
  = the permeability of free space = 4π x 10−7 H/m.
  = relative magnetic permeability of the material. Magnetically conductive materials such as copper typically have a  near 1.
 .

This velocity is the speed with which electromagnetic waves penetrate into the conductor and is not the drift velocity of the conduction electrons.  In copper at 60Hz,  3.2m/s.  As a consequence of Snell's Law and the extremely low speed, electromagnetic waves always enter good conductors in a direction that is within a milliradian of normal to the surface, regardless of the angle of incidence.

Electromagnetic waves in circuits
In the theoretical investigation of electric circuits, the velocity of propagation of the electromagnetic field through space is usually not considered; the field is assumed, as a precondition, to be present throughout space. The magnetic component of the field is considered to be in phase with the current, and the electric component is considered to be in phase with the voltage. The electric field starts at the conductor, and propagates through space at the velocity of light (which depends on the material it is traveling through).  Note that the electromagnetic fields do not move through space. It is the electromagnetic energy that moves; the corresponding fields simply grow and decline in a region of space in response to the flow of energy. At any point in space, the electric field corresponds not to the condition of the electric energy flow at that moment, but to that of the flow at a moment earlier.  The latency is determined by the time required for the field to propagate from the conductor to the point under consideration.  In other words, the greater the distance from the conductor, the more the electric field lags.

Since the velocity of propagation is very high – about 300,000 kilometers per second – the wave of an alternating or oscillating current, even of high frequency, is of considerable length.  At 60 cycles per second, the wavelength is 5,000 kilometers, and even at 100,000 hertz, the wavelength is 3 kilometers.  This is a very large distance compared to those typically used in field measurement and application.

The important part of the electric field of a conductor extends to the return conductor, which usually is only a few feet distant.  At greater distance, the aggregate field can be approximated by the differential field between conductor and return conductor, which tend to cancel.  Hence, the intensity of the electric field is usually inappreciable at a distance which is still small compared to the wavelength.  Within the range in which an appreciable field exists, this field is practically in phase with the flow of energy in the conductor.  That is, the velocity of propagation has no appreciable effect unless the return conductor is very distant, or entirely absent, or the frequency is so high that the distance to the return conductor is an appreciable portion of the wavelength.

Electric drift

The drift velocity deals with the average velocity of a particle, such as an electron, due to an electric field. In general, an electron will propagate randomly in a conductor at the Fermi velocity. Free electrons in a conductor follow a random path.  Without the presence of an electric field, the electrons have no net velocity.  When a DC voltage is applied, the electron drift velocity will increase in speed proportionally to the strength of the electric field. The drift velocity in a 2 mm diameter copper wire in 1 ampere current is approximately 8 cm per hour. AC voltages cause no net movement; the electrons oscillate back and forth in response to the alternating electric field (over a distance of a few micrometers – see example calculation).

See also
Speed of light
Speed of gravity
Speed of sound
Telegrapher's equations
Reflections of signals on conducting lines

References

Further reading
 Alfvén, H. (1950). Cosmical electrodynamics. Oxford: Clarendon Press
 Alfvén, H. (1981). Cosmic plasma. Taylor & Francis US.
 "Velocity of Propagation of Electric Field", Theory and Calculation of Transient Electric Phenomena and Oscillations by Charles Proteus Steinmetz, Chapter VIII, p. 394-, McGraw-Hill, 1920.
 Fleming, J. A. (1911). Propagation of electric currents in telephone & telegraph conductors. New York: Van Nostrand

External links 
 Propagation Times

Electromagnetism
Electricity